Deshanabu Tissa Ananda Abeysekara (7 May 1939 – 18 April 2009 as තිස්ස අබේසේකර) was a Sri Lankan filmmaker, actor, writer, director, screen playwright and political activist. He is better known as a script writer for the cinema as well as a film director. In 1996, his book Bringing Tony Home won the prestigious Gratiaen Prize for the new creative writing in English. He was the chief coordinator of FOSWAL in Sri Lanka and honoured awardee of SAARC Literary Award.

Personal life
Tissa's grandfather was Mudaliyar Carolis de Fonseka and is the great-grandson of Gate Mudaliyar Solomon de Fonseka. He grew up in his ancestral house, Greenlands in Havelock Town, Colombo. Tissa's paternal uncle (fathers brother) was Justice E.R. de Fonseka, QC, Puisne Judge of the Supreme Court and Acting Chief Justice of Sri Lanka in 1960 and subsequently in 1962. Tissa's father was also cousins with the late Sir Susantha de Fonseka who was also Tissa's Godfather. Tissa's father declared bankruptcy in 1949. Due to poor health, Tissa was not sent to school until age 11. Tutored at home at first, he had his formal education at Dharmapala Vidyalaya in Pannipitiya where he went onto captain the schools soccer team and be its head prefect.

He was married to Asanka Monarvilla and the couple have one daughter Svetlana, and one son, Dimitra.

Death
Abeysekara died on 18 April 2009, at Colombo National Hospital after having been admitted for a heart condition (Myocardial infarction). The BBC stated: "The void that he has left can only be understood if one looks at a washed away painting and understands and realizes that its beauty can never be glorified or recreated again.". His funeral was held over three days in four locations and remains one of the most attended funerals in the countries history. A memorial service was held at the Chapel of the Hope of the World, Ladies' college Colombo, to commemorate the anniversary of his death.

In late 2013, the Government of Sri Lanka, under the auspices of the President, Prime Minister and Cabinet issued a Commemorative Stamp in memory and honour of the late Dr Tissa Abeysekara.

Career
Abeysekera began his career as a short-story writer, writing in Sinhala, when he was still a schoolboy, and he got some short stories published in the Dinamina and Janatha national newspapers. Barely out of his teens, he published a collection of Sinhala short stories, which received favourable reviews, bringing him praise from Ediriweera Sarachchandra.

A chance meeting with Dr. Lester James Peries in the early 1960s lured him to the cinema, where he remained for the next 40 years. He received co-credit for most of Peries's films, following the screenplay he wrote for Welikatara, Tissa was launched into the world of scriptwriting and recognized as Sri Lanka's foremost screenplay, dialogue and scriptwriter. Important screenplays were those for Nidhanaya and Welikathara. In addition, he made over 40 documentaries for the Government Film Unit before breaking through as a feature filmmaker with Karumakkarayo, based on Gunadasa Amarasekara's controversial novel. This was followed by Mahagedara (1983) and Viragaya (1988), based on Martin Wickramasinghe's novel, which was thought unfilmable: Viragaya is considered one of the finest Sinhala films ever made.

Abeysekara received the Presidential Award for Best Supporting Actor in 1978 for the five minutes role as "Kudapola Thero" in the blockbuster film Veera Puran Appu. In 1996, his novella Bringing Tony Home won the Gratiaen Prize for the best piece of Creative Writing in English by a resident Sri Lankan. He continued writing mostly in English, bringing out another collection of three stories, In My Kingdom of the Sun and the Holy Peak.

He was chairman of the National Film Corporation from 1999 to 2001. He was subsequently the director of the Sri Lanka Television Training Institute. Abeysekara served on the Boards of the Sri Lanka Rupavahini Corporation and the Aesthetic Institute of Sri Lanka, affiliated to the University of Kelaniya, as a council member of the University of Visual and Performing Arts, Colombo, and as a trustee of the National Heritage Trust of Sri Lanka. In 2007, he was awarded an honorary doctorate by University of Colombo.

National honours
1998: Kala Suri State Honour for contribution to film
1998: Sarvodaya National Award, for Contribution to the Communication Arts
1998: Vishwaprasidini State Honour for Outstanding Contribution to the Arts
2005: Ranathisara for Lifetime Achievement in Film in Sri Lanka at the Sarasaviya National Awards.
2005: Deshabandu, National Honour by the Government of Sri Lanka

Filmography

Published works

Ipanella (short stories)
Pitagamkarayo (teledrama)
Ayale Giya Sithaka Satahan (essays)
Rupa-Svarupa (essay on film)
Cinema Sithuvili (on the art of film)
Bringing Tony Home A story in three movements (Forbidden Territory, 1988; first US publication by North Atlantic Books, 2008)
In My Kingdom of the Sun and the Holy Peak (Vijitha Yapa Publications, 2004)
Roots, Reflections and Reminiscences (Sarasavi Publishers, 2007)
Wiwurtha Arthikaya, Rupavahiniya, Chithrapata Sansthawa Saha Sinamawe Arbudayaya (1991)
 Wiragaya - Screenplay (1993)
 Guru Gedara'' - Screenplay (2011)

References

External links

1939 births
2009 deaths
Sri Lankan male film actors
Sinhalese male actors
Sri Lankan film directors
Sinhalese writers
Sri Lankan novelists
Sri Lankan male screenwriters
Alumni of Dharmapala Vidyalaya
Kala Suri
20th-century novelists
Deshabandu
20th-century screenwriters